"Spy in the House of Love" is a song by art-funk ensemble Was (Not Was). It was released in 1987, but became a large hit for the group in the U.S. and the UK in 1988.

Track listing
7" vinyl [worldwide] / Cassette [US] 
"Spy in the House of Love" – 4:18
"Dad I'm in Jail" – 1:24

12" vinyl (1) [Europe]
"Spy in the House of Love (Jeffrey B. Young and Dangerous Mix)" – 6:31
"Dad I'm in Jail" – 1:25
"Spy in the House of Love (Streetshead Mix)" – 5:29

12" vinyl (2) [Europe] 
"Spy in the House of Love (Jeffrey B. Young and Dangerous Mix)" – 6:31
"Spy in the House of Love (Single Mix)"
"Spy in the House of Love (In House Mix)"
"Dad I'm in Jail" – 1:25

12" vinyl (3) [Europe] / CD [Europe]
"Spy in the House of Love (Jeffrey B. Young and Dangerous Mix)" – 6:31
"Walk The Dinosaur (The New York Dangerous Mix)" – 6:01
"Dad I'm in Jail" – 1:25
"Spy in the House of Love (Streetshead Mix)" – 5:29

12 vinyl (4) [Europe]
"Spy in the House of Love (Jeffrey B. Young & Dangerous Mix)" – 6:32
"Dad I'm In Jail" – 1:25
"Spy in the House of Love (Streetsahead Mix)" – 5:30
"Spy in the House of Love (My Name Is Young, Jeffrey B. Young, Licensed To 'ill Mix)" – 6:06

12" vinyl [US]
"Spy in the House of Love (Jeffrey B. Young & Dangerous Mix)" – 6:30
"Spy in the House of Love (Streetsahead Mix)" – 5:30
"Spy in the House of Love (Derek B. Mix)" – 4:54
"Spy in the House of Love (Single Mix)" – 4:00

Remixes
 "Single Mix" – 4:01
 "Jeffrey B. Young and Dangerous Mix" – 6:31 – mixed by Jeff Young.
 "My Name Is Young, Jeffrey B. Young, Licensed To 'ill Mix" – 6:06 – mixed by Jeff Young.
 "Streetshead Mix" – 5:29 – mixed by Streets Ahead.
 "In House Mix" – mixed by Paul Staveley O'Duffy.
 "Derek B. Mix" – 4:54 – mixed by Derek B.

Chart positions

References

Songs about spies
1987 songs
1987 singles
1988 singles
Was (Not Was) songs
Song recordings produced by Don Was
Songs written by David Was
Songs written by Don Was
Chrysalis Records singles
Fontana Records singles